Trophon clenchi is a species of sea snail, a marine gastropod mollusk in the family Muricidae, the murex snails or rock snails.

Distribution
It can be found off of Argentina and Uruguay.

References

Gastropods described in 1953
Trophon